Dendromigadops is a genus of ground beetles in the family Carabidae. There are at least two described species in Dendromigadops.

Species
These two species belong to the genus Dendromigadops:
 Dendromigadops alticola Baehr, 2013  (Australia)
 Dendromigadops gloriosus Baehr, 2013  (Australia)

References

Migadopinae